Riverside House Meadow is a  biological Site of Special Scientific Interest south-west of Hasketon in Suffolk.

This unimproved grassland is traditionally managed with a hay cut in the summer, and it has diverse grasses and herbs. The number of such meadows has declined considerably due to changes in agriculture. Eleven grass species and 52 other plants have been recorded.

The site is private land with no public access.

References

Sites of Special Scientific Interest in Suffolk